The 1930 Wightman Cup was the 8th edition of the annual competition between the United States and Great Britain. It was held at the All England Lawn Tennis and Croquet Club in London, England on 13–14 June 1930.

See also
 1931 Davis Cup

References

Wightman Cups by year
Wightman Cup, 1930
Wightman Cup
Wightman Cup
Wightman Cup
Wightman Cup